Silow or Silu may refer to:
 Silow, Kermanshah
 Silu, Khuzestan